Trudeaumania was the nickname given in early 1968 to the excitement generated by Pierre Elliott Trudeau's entry into the leadership race of the Liberal Party of Canada. Trudeaumania continued during the subsequent federal election campaign and during Trudeau's early years as Prime Minister of Canada.  Decades later, Trudeau's son, Justin Trudeau, drew a similar international reaction when he became Prime Minister himself in 2015.

Pierre Elliott Trudeau 
Many young people in Canada at this time, especially young women, were influenced by the 1960s counterculture and identified with Trudeau, an energetic nonconformist who was relatively young.  They were dazzled by his "charm and good looks", and a large fan base was established throughout the country. He would often be stopped in the streets for his autograph or for photographs.  Trudeau had once sympathized with Marxists and had spent time in the democratic socialist Cooperative Commonwealth Federation, and many of his fans were attracted to his culturally liberal stances (he legalized homosexuality and created more flexible divorce laws as Justice Minister under Lester B. Pearson).  Trudeau was also admired for his laid-back attitude and his celebrity relationships; in that word's prevailing use at the time, describing a modern, "hip and happening person", he was often described as a swinger.  A high point happened during Trudeau's election campaign in 1968 during the annual Saint-Jean-Baptiste Day parade in Montreal, when rioting Quebec separatists threw rocks and bottles at the grandstand where Trudeau was seated. Rejecting the pleas of his aides that he take cover, Trudeau stayed in his seat, facing the rioters, without any sign of fear. The image of the politician showing such courage impressed the Canadian people, and he handily won the election the next day.

Trudeaumania began to abate after Prime Minister Trudeau married Margaret Sinclair in 1971, but he is still remembered as one of Canada's most polarizing politicians and prime ministers;  fondly recalled by many Central and Eastern Canadians, but unpopular among conservative and nationalist thinkers, especially in Quebec and the western provinces. He was named the Canadian Newsmaker of the 20th Century by the Canadian Press at the dawn of the year 2000. When he died later that year, there was an outpouring of public grief, and he was again named Newsmaker of the Year for 2000 itself. In 2004, he was voted the third-Greatest Canadian by CBC viewers, after Terry Fox and Tommy Douglas.

A Canadian board game of the early 1980s, "True Dough Mania", was titled with a pun on the phenomenon. The game was a satire on Canadian politics.

Justin Trudeau 

In 2015, Pierre Trudeau's son, Justin Trudeau, was elected Prime Minister in the 2015 Canadian federal election.  When Justin's face was in the international press, he drew comments of a similar nature online as a senior Canadian politician who was unexpectedly young looking and handsome in the general public's opinion.

See also
Trudeauism
Jacindamania
Jokowi Effect
Just watch me
Fuddle duddle

References

External links 

CBC Archives

Canadian culture
Political history of Canada
Pierre Trudeau
1968 in Canada
2015 in Canada
Justin Trudeau
Liberal Party of Canada
Mania
Celebrity fandom